William Curtis Colepaugh (March 25, 1918 – March 16, 2005) was an American who, following his 1943 discharge from the U.S. Naval Reserve ("for the good of the service", according to official reports), defected to Nazi Germany in 1944. While a crewman on a repatriation ship that stopped off in Lisbon, Colepaugh defected at the German consulate. Colepaugh had attended Admiral Farragut Academy in Pine Beach, New Jersey.

Early years 
Colepaugh was born in Connecticut. His mother didn't send him to public school. She instead sent Colepaugh to the Admiral Farragut Academy. He flunked out of the Massachusetts Institute of Technology. Colepaugh was remembered there for being rabidly anti-Semitic. He would launch into a tirade against the Jews at the slightest provocation.

Secret agent

Colepaugh was given extensive firearms and espionage training at a spy-school in the German-occupied The Hague. He spoke virtually no German. Their mission, Operation Elster ("Magpie"), was to gather technical information on the Allied war effort and transmit it back to Germany using a radio they were expected to build.

Together Colepaugh and Gimpel made their way to Boston and then by train to New York. Soon, Colepaugh abandoned the mission, taking US$48,000 ($ today) of the currency they had brought and spending a month partying and carousing with local women.  After spending $1,500 ($ today) in less than a month, Colepaugh visited an old schoolfriend and asked for help to turn himself in to the FBI, hoping for immunity.  The FBI was already searching for the two German agents following the sinking of a Canadian ship a few miles from the Maine coastline (indicating a U-boat had been nearby) and reports of suspicious sightings by local residents. The FBI interrogated Colepaugh, which then enabled them to track down Gimpel.

After their capture, the pair were handed over to U.S. military authorities on the instructions of the Attorney General. In February 1945, they stood trial before a Military Commission, accused of conspiracy and violating the 82nd Article of War. They were found guilty and sentenced to be hanged. The execution date was sent for April 15, 1945. Three days before their executions were to be carried out, President Franklin D. Roosevelt unexpectedly died. As tradition for a time of national mourning, all federal executions were put on hold. After the war ended, their sentences were commuted to life imprisonment by President Harry Truman. Gimpel was paroled in 1955; Colepaugh, whose sentence was further reduced to 30 years in 1952, was paroled in 1960.

Last years
After his release, Colepaugh moved to King of Prussia, Pennsylvania, near Philadelphia, where he worked in a print shop. He subsequently owned and operated a retail business that sold office furniture. He married and participated in community activities, volunteered with the Boy Scouts and became a member of Rotary. He died of complications from Alzheimer's disease in 2005.

Gimpel and Colepaugh are believed to have been the last Nazi German spies in World War II who reached the United States.

See also
John Codd
Erich Gimpel

References

External links
 Article on Colepaugh and Gimpel at fas.org
 Allied report on the interrogation of Colepaugh and Gimpel at ibiblio.org
 Contains a report on Colepaugh and Gimpel  at navy.mil
 On A Dark and Stormy Night (archived) 
 CRS Report for Congress "Military Tribunals: The Quirin Precedent," March 26, 2002
 G-Men Grab Two Nazi Spies

1918 births
2005 deaths
People from East Lyme, Connecticut
American sailors
Admiral Farragut Academy alumni
Deaths from Alzheimer's disease
American people convicted of spying for Nazi Germany
United States Navy personnel of World War II
United States Navy reservists
United States Navy sailors
American prisoners sentenced to death
Prisoners sentenced to death by the United States military
Recipients of American presidential clemency
Neurological disease deaths in Pennsylvania